The  brown-throated martin or  brown-throated sand martin (Riparia paludicola) is a small passerine bird in the swallow family. It was first formally described as Hirundo paludicola by French ornithologist Louis Vieillot in 1817 in his Nouveau Dictionnaire d'Histoire Naturelle. It was formerly regarded as conspecific with the grey-throated martin (R. chinensis) under the name "plain martin".

It has a wide range in Africa. It is a partially migratory species, with some populations making seasonal movements. It is usually associated closely with water as its specific epithet paludicola suggests.

The brown-throated martin is colonial in its nesting habits, with many pairs breeding close together, according to available space. The nests are at the end of tunnels of 30 to 60 cm in length, bored in sandbanks. The actual nest is a litter of straw and feathers in a chamber at the end of the burrow. Two to four white eggs are the normal clutch, and are incubated by both parents.

Its brown back, small size and quicker, jerkier flight separate the brown-throated martin at once from most other members of the swallow family. It is most similar to the sand martin,  Riparia riparia , which is its northern counterpart.

The 12 cm long brown-throated martin is brown above and white or pale brown below. It lacks the narrow brown band on the breast shown by the sand martin; the bill is black and the legs are brown. Sexes are similar, but the young have pale tips to the feathers on the rump and wings.

The races differ in size and plumage tones of the upperparts or underparts.

 R. p. paludicola, southern Africa. White underparts.
 R. p. paludibula, western Africa. Smaller and darker above than the nominate form.
 R. p. ducis, eastern Africa. Smaller and darker above and below than the nominate subspecies.
 R. p. mauretanica, Morocco. Small and pale.
 R. p. newtoni, mountains of Cameroon only. Darker above than the nominate form, brownish underparts.
 R. p. cowani, Madagascar. Small, greyish underparts.

The food of this species consists of small insects, mostly gnats and other flies whose early stages are aquatic.

The twittering song of the brown-throated martin is continuous when the birds are on the wing, and becomes a conversational undertone after they have settled in the roost. There is also a harsh alarm call.

References

External links
 Brown-throated martin - Species text in The Atlas of Southern African Birds.

brown-throated martin
Birds of Africa
brown-throated martin
brown-throated martin